Sandy may refer to:

People and fictional characters 
Sandy (given name), including a list of people and fictional characters
Sandy (surname), a list of people
Sandy (singer), Brazilian singer and actress Sandy Leah Lima (born 1983)
(Sandy) Alex G, a former stage name of American singer-songwriter and multi-instrumentalist Alexander Giannascoli (born 1993)
Sandy (Egyptian singer) (born 1986), Arabic singer
 Sandy Mitchell, pen name of British writer Alex Stewart

Places 
 Sandy, Bedfordshire, England, a market town and civil parish
 Sandy railway station
 Sandy, Carmarthenshire, Wales
 Sandy, Florida, an unincorporated area in Manatee County
 Sandy, Oregon, a city
 Sandy, Pennsylvania, a census-designated place
 Sandy, Utah, a city
 Sandy, Kanawha County, West Virginia, an unincorporated community
 Sandy, Monongalia County, West Virginia, an unincorporated community
 Sandy, Taylor County, West Virginia, an unincorporated community
 Sandy Bay (Newfoundland and Labrador)
 Sandy Bay, Gibraltar
 Sandy Bay, Hong Kong
 Sandy Bay, Saint Helena
 Sandy Beach, Hawaii
 Sandy Creek (disambiguation)
 Sandy Glacier, Oregon
 Sandy Island (disambiguation)
 Sandy Islands (disambiguation)
 Sandy Ridge, Hong Kong
 Sandy River (disambiguation)
 Sandy Township (disambiguation)

Arts and entertainment

Music
 Sandy Records, a rock-and-roll label in Mobile, Alabama

Albums
 Sandy (Sandy Denny album), 1972
 Sandy (Sandy Lam album), 1987
 Sandy (Sandy Salisbury album), 2001

Songs
 "Sandy" (Larry Hall song), a song by Larry Hall from 1959
 "Sandy" (Dion DiMucci song), a song by Dion DiMucci from 1963
 "4th of July, Asbury Park (Sandy)", a 1973 song by Bruce Springsteen from The Wild, The Innocent and The E Street Shuffle
 "Sandy", a song by the Carpenters on A Kind of Hush, 1976
 "Sandy" (Grease song), a 1978 song sung by John Travolta in the film Grease
 "Sandy", a song sung by Aileen Quinn in Annie from 1982

Other arts and entertainment
 Sandy (novel), a popular 1905 novel by Alice Hegan Rice
 Sandy (1918 film), an American silent drama film starring Jack Pickford
 Sandy (1926 film), an American drama film starring Madge Bellamy

Other uses
 Hurricane Sandy, a tropical cyclone of the 2012 Atlantic hurricane season
 Operation Sandy, a test launch of a V-2 rocket in 1947 from the aircraft carrier USS Midway
 Sandy, or sandy whiting, common name for the fish species Pseudaphritis urvillii
 "Sandy", the nickname for search and rescue (SAR) escort duty typically flown by the A-1 Skyraider
 Sandy (log canoe), Sherwood, Maryland, on the National Register of Historic Places
 Sandy's, a former fast-food chain purchased by Hardee's in 1979
 Sandy, a.k.a. Sandman, a character in the 2012 film Rise of the Guardians

See also 
 Sandhi, a variety of phonological processes
 Sandi (disambiguation)
 Sandie (disambiguation)